Alive at Last is a live album by Train recorded at Workplay Theatre in Birmingham, Alabama over three consecutive nights from June 9 to June 11, 2004.

It included most of the hits from Train's catalogue, even boasting some rare B-side tracks, and a cover of The Faces hit "Stay With Me".

The final two tracks on the album, "Ordinary" and "New Sensation" were included as bonus studio tracks. "Ordinary" was originally written for the movie Spider-Man 2 and appeared on the soundtrack, it was also released as a single.

Track listing
 "Calling All Angels"
 "She's On Fire"
 "Meet Virginia"
 "Save the Day"
 "Get to Me"
 "Landmine"
 "All American Girl"
 "When I Look to the Sky"
 "Latin Interlude"
 "I Wish You Would"
 "Sweet Rain"
 "Free"
 "Drops of Jupiter (Tell Me)"
 "Stay With Me" (The Faces cover)
 "Ordinary" (strings arranged by David Campbell) (Bonus studio track)
 "New Sensation" (Bonus studio track)

References

Train (band) albums
2004 live albums
Columbia Records live albums